Orlando Bobo (February 9, 1974 – May 14, 2007) was an American football player who played the position of guard for three National Football League teams from 1997 to 2001 and in the Canadian Football League for the Winnipeg Blue Bombers in 2004. He was a member of the Baltimore Ravens for their victory at Super Bowl XXXV.

Orlando Bobo died of heart and liver failure at the age of 33. He was laid to rest at Greenwood Cemetery in West Point, Mississippi.

References

1974 births
2007 deaths
American football offensive guards
Louisiana–Monroe Warhawks football players
Minnesota Vikings players
Cleveland Browns players
Baltimore Ravens players
Winnipeg Blue Bombers players
Players of American football from Mississippi 
Deaths from multiple organ failure
People from West Point, Mississippi
East Mississippi Lions football players
Deaths from liver failure